Little Derby is a Derby-style cheese made outside Derbyshire, similar in flavour and texture to Cheddar, but without the annatto colouring used in Derby cheese. 

One manufacturer of the cheese, Fowlers, is based in Earlswood, Warwickshire, having moved from Derbyshire in 1918. Their Little Derby cheese is made with pasteurised cow's milk, producing a semi-hard cheese with a fat content of about 48%. Annatto is not used, but the rinds of the  diameter wheels are washed with red wine to give an orange colour. The  cheeses are matured for seven months.

See also
 List of British cheeses

References

English cheeses
Cow's-milk cheeses